Peter Jackson (22 September 1934 — 10 October 2014) was an Irish international tennis player originating from Northern Ireland.

Raised in Belfast, UK, Jackson was a junior rugby representative for Ulster before settling on tennis. He attended the Belfast Royal Academy and played his tennis at the Windsor club, although he began his career with Cavehill. An Irish number one for nine consecutive years, he featured at both Wimbledon and the U.S. National Championships during his career.

Jackson debuted for the Irish Davis Cup team in 1959 and had the first of his seven singles wins in 1962 over Austria's Detlef Herdy. In Dublin in 1970 he came from two sets down to lose in five against Yugoslavia's Željko Franulović, who two-weeks later reached the French Open final. A disagreement with selectors prompted his tennis retirement in 1973, finishing his career with 33 Davis Cup appearances across singles and doubles, from 18 ties.

See also
List of Ireland Davis Cup team representatives

References

External links
 
 
 

1934 births
2014 deaths
Irish male tennis players
Tennis players from Northern Ireland
Sportspeople from Belfast
People educated at the Belfast Royal Academy